Li Xueyao (born 11 April 1995) is a Chinese ski jumper.

World Cup

Standings

Individual starts (47)

External links 

1995 births
Living people
Chinese female ski jumpers
Skiers from Changchun
Ski jumpers at the 2012 Winter Youth Olympics